Agronomovca is a commune in Ungheni District, Moldova. It is composed of three villages: Agronomovca, Negurenii Noi and Zăzulenii Noi.

References

Communes of Ungheni District